In graph theory, an edge dominating set for a graph G = (V, E) is a subset D ⊆ E such that every edge not in D is adjacent to at least one edge in D. An edge dominating set is also known as a line dominating set. Figures (a)–(d) are examples of edge dominating sets (thick red lines).

A minimum edge dominating set is a smallest edge dominating set. Figures (a) and (b) are examples of minimum edge dominating sets (it can be checked that there is no edge dominating set of size 2 for this graph).

Properties 

An edge dominating set for G is a dominating set for its line graph L(G) and vice versa.

Any maximal matching is always an edge dominating set. Figures (b) and (d) are examples of maximal matchings.

Furthermore, the size of a minimum edge dominating set equals the size of a minimum maximal matching. A minimum maximal matching is a minimum edge dominating set; Figure (b) is an example of a minimum maximal matching. A minimum edge dominating set is not necessarily a minimum maximal matching, as illustrated in Figure (a); however, given a minimum edge dominating set D, it is easy to find a minimum maximal matching with |D| edges (see, e.g.).

Algorithms and computational complexity 

Determining whether there is an edge dominating set of a given size for a given graph is an NP-complete problem (and therefore finding a minimum edge dominating set is an NP-hard problem).  show that the problem is NP-complete even in the case of a bipartite graph with maximum degree 3, and also in the case of a planar graph with maximum degree 3.

There is a simple polynomial-time approximation algorithm with approximation factor 2: find any maximal matching. A maximal matching is an edge dominating set; furthermore, a maximal matching M can be at worst 2 times as large as a smallest maximal matching, and a smallest maximal matching has the same size as the smallest edge dominating set.

Also the edge-weighted version of the problem can be approximated within factor 2, but the algorithm is considerably more complicated .

 show that finding a better than (7/6)-approximation is NP-hard. Schmied & Viehmann proved that the Problem is UGC-hard to approximate to within any constant better than 3/2.

References 

.
Minimum edge dominating set (optimisation version) is the problem GT3 in Appendix B (page 370).
Minimum maximal matching (optimisation version) is the problem GT10 in Appendix B (page 374).
 .
.
Edge dominating set (decision version) is discussed under the dominating set problem, which is the problem GT2 in Appendix A1.1.
Minimum maximal matching (decision version) is the problem GT10 in Appendix A1.1.
 .
 .
 .
Richard Schmied & Claus Viehmann (2012), "Approximating edge dominating set in dense graphs", Theor. Comput. Sci. 414(1), pp. 92-99.

External links 

 Pierluigi Crescenzi, Viggo Kann, Magnús Halldórsson, Marek Karpinski, Gerhard Woeginger (2000), "A compendium of NP optimization problems":
 Minimum Edge Dominating Set,
 Minimum Maximal Matching.

NP-complete problems
Computational problems in graph theory